WPIF (1470 AM) is a radio station  broadcasting an oldies format. Licensed to Georgetown, South Carolina, United States, the station serves the Myrtle Beach area and serves a particular focus towards the residents of Pawleys Island.

History
WPIF originally signed on as WGOO in March 1962 by the Collins Corporation of Vidalia, Georgia with Frank K. Graham, President. Gordon Linscott was the original station manager with Charles Lohr and Vincent Hayes as other managers during the period 1962 to 1967. The station's programming was a variety of music. On May 1, 1967, WGOO was sold to Winyah Bay Broadcasting Company of Georgetown with A. I. Fogel as President. Harry R. "Tad" Fogel was station manager and the call letters were changed to WINH. WINH affiliated with the ABC Information Network on June 1, 1968, and in September 1971, WINH-FM (now WWXM) signed on. Both the AM & FM stations were sold in October 1984. Tad Fogel was inducted into the South Carolina Broadcaster's Association "Hall of Fame" in January 2010.

After the 1984 sale, the WINH call letters were changed to WVBX on March 20, 1985. On April 15, 1994, the station changed its call sign to WLMC.

In August 2018, WLMC changed formats from gospel to oldies.

On January 9, 2022 the station rebranded as "The New 101.1 PI-FM", continuing their oldies format but focusing more on the listeners of Pawleys Island. The station changed its call sign to WPIF to match on January 24.

Previous logo

References

External links

PIF
Oldies radio stations in the United States
Radio stations established in 1962
1962 establishments in South Carolina